Maryanovsky District is an administrative and municipal district (raion), one of the thirty-two in Omsk Oblast, Russia. It is located in the southwest of the oblast. Its administrative center is the urban locality (a work settlement) of Maryanovka. Population: 27,595 (2010 Census);  The population of Maryanovka accounts for 31.3% of the district's total population.

Geography 
Maryanovsky district is located in the south of the West Siberian Plain. The Kamyshlov Log runs across the area.

References

Notes

Sources

External links
Unofficial website of Maryanovsky District 

Districts of Omsk Oblast
